Mary Elizabeth Byrne, M.A. (2 July 1880 – 19 January 1931) was an Irish linguist, author, and journalist.

She translated the Old Irish Hymn, "Bí Thusa 'mo Shúile," into English as "Be Thou My Vision" in Ériu (the journal of the School of Irish Learning), in 1905.

A linguist, Byrne received her education from the Dominican Convent in Dublin, and the National University of Ireland, where she graduated in 1905. She received the Chancellor's Gold Medal at the Royal University of Ireland. She worked for the Board of Intermediate Education, and helped compile the Catalog of the Royal Irish Academy. She also contributed to the Old and Mid-Irish Dictionary and Dictionary of the Irish Language, and wrote a treatise on England in the Age of Chaucer.

References 

1880 births
1931 deaths
Celtic studies scholars
Irish writers
Irish women journalists
Alumni of the Royal University of Ireland